KEDG (106.9 FM) is a radio station broadcasting an adult contemporary format. Licensed to Alexandria, Louisiana, United States. The station is currently owned by Flinn Broadcasting Corporation.  Its studios and transmitter are separately located in Pineville.

History
KEDG was originally a modern rock station branded as "Modern Rock Edge 107" until 2000 when Edge 107 was replaced by an urban format as "Kiss 106.9 Alexandria's # 1 For Hip Hop and R&B".  Kiss 106.9 lasted until 2006 when Clear Channel sold its Alexandria cluster to Cenla Broadcasting and Cenla replaced Clear Channel's adult contemporary outlet KKST-FM Star 98.7 with the urban KISS format that had been on 106.9 KEDG-FM for 6 years.  KKST-FM Star 98.7 was gone and replaced with KEDG-FM's Urban format, branding itself as 98.7 KISS-FM Alexandria's # 1 For Hip Hop and R&B.  That of course did not spell the end for STAR, because Flinn Broadcasting adopted the hot adult contemporary format on 106.9 branding it as STAR 106.9, The '80s, '90s & Now and ultimately Alexandria's STAR was reborn in a new home.  It has since been under a local marketing agreement  by Opus Media Partners, L.L.C. In April 2008, The radio station segued its format from hot ac to adult contemporary and on October 6, 2008, brought the syndicated radio show Delilah to air on the station airing from 6–11 p.m. seven days a week until the station switched to Christmas music in 2009. Delilah is now on from 7-midnight. After Christmas 2008 the station changed its name from star 106.9 to sunny 106.9. the stations slogan was also changed from the '80s '90s and now to the best variety of yesterday and today.

At Christmas time Sunny 106.9 plays continuous Christmas music from the Friday before Thanksgiving all the way to Christmas Day. At this time the station is generally known as the Christmas Sunny 106.9 with the slogan "all your holiday favorites it's a central Louisiana tradition". Sunny 106.9 also airs the John Tesh Radio Show.

References

External links

Radio stations in Louisiana
Hot adult contemporary radio stations in the United States